The Nena people are an African tribe first encountered in the last quarter of the 19th century in the north-east Livingstone Mountains in what is now Tanzania by two different European travellers. The Scottish explorer Joseph Thomson stumbled across them in 1879 during his journey from the East African coast to Lake Nyasa (now also known as Lake Malawi) (Thomson 1881). Eighteen years later, in 1897, they were encountered a second time by the German priest Alphonse Adams (Adams 1899).

Thomson and Adams' accounts had a number of similarities, which makes it probable that they met the same group of people.  However,  the next European visitor could find no trace of the Nena (Fülleborn 1906): they went missing from the ethnographic record and did not feature in subsequent German and British colonial reports. In the 1970s, however, people called Nena were reported to be living much further south in the Livingstone Mountains, and they were presumed to be related to the group described by Thomson and Adams (Stirnimann 1976). It remains to be established whether this is the case.

References 
 Adams, A. (1899). Im Dienste des Kreuzes, Errinerungen aus meinen Missionsleben in Deutsch-Ostafrika. Augsburg: St. Ottilien.
 Fülleborn, F. (1906). Das Deutsche Njassa- und Ruwuma-Gebeit, Land und Leute nebst Bemerkungen über du Schire-Länder. Berlin: Dietrich Reimer.
 Stirnimann, H. (1976). Existenzgrundlagen und Traditionelles Handwerk der Pangwa von SW.-Tansania. Freiburg: Universitätsverlag Freiburg Schweiz.
 Thomson, J. (1881). To the Central African Lakes and Back: The Narrative of the Royal Geographical Society’s East Central African Expedition 1878-80 (Vol. I). London: Sampson Low, Marston, Searle & Rivington.

Ethnic groups in Tanzania
Indigenous peoples of East Africa